Boron suboxide (chemical formula B6O) is a solid compound with a structure built of eight icosahedra at the apexes of the rhombohedral unit cell. Each icosahedron is composed of twelve boron atoms. Two oxygen atoms are located in the interstices along the [111] rhombohedral direction. Due to its short interatomic bond lengths and strongly covalent character, B6O displays a range of outstanding physical and chemical properties such as great hardness (close to that of rhenium diboride and boron nitride), low mass density, high thermal conductivity, high chemical inertness, and excellent wear resistance.

B6O can be synthesized by reducing B2O3 with boron or by oxidation of boron with zinc oxide or other oxidants. These boron suboxide materials formed at or near ambient pressure are generally oxygen deficient and non-stoichiometric (B6Ox, x<0.9) and have poor crystallinity and very small grain size (less than 5 μm). High pressure applied during the synthesis of B6O can significantly increase the crystallinity, oxygen stoichiometry, and crystal size of the products. Mixtures of boron and B2O3 powders were usually used as starting materials in the reported methods for B6O synthesis.

Oxygen-deficient boron suboxide (B6Ox, x<0.9) might form icosahedral particles, which are neither single crystals nor quasicrystals, but twinned groups of twenty tetrahedral crystals.

B6O of the α-rhombohedral boron type has been investigated because of its ceramic nature (hardness, high melting point, chemical stability, and low density) as a new structural material. In addition to this, these borides have unique bonding not easily accessible by the usual valence theory. Although an X-ray emission spectroscopic method indicated a probable parameter range for the oxygen site of B6O, the correct oxygen position remained open to question until Rietveld analysis of X-ray diffraction profiles on B6O powders were first carried out successfully, even though these were preliminary investigations.

Preparation 
B6O can be prepared by three methods:
 (1) solid state reaction between B and B2O3,
 (2) reduction of  B2O3 and
 (3) oxidation of B. The high vapor pressure of B2O3 at elevated temperatures would cause the B excess composition in the process of the solid state reaction between B and B2O3.
In the reduction of B2O3, reductants that can be used include, but not limited to, Si and Mg which remain in B6O as an impurity in the process. While in the oxidation process of B, oxidants such as ZnO would contaminate B6O in the process.

Physical properties

B6O has a strong covalent nature and is easy to compose at temperatures greater than 1,973 K. Boron suboxide has also been reported to exhibit a wide range of superior properties such as high hardness with low density, high mechanical strength, oxidation resistance up to high temperatures as well as its high chemical inertness. 
Preliminary first-principle ab initio density functional calculations of the structural properties boron suboxide (B6O) suggest that the strength of bonding in B6O may be enhanced by the presence of a high electronegativity interstitial in the structure. The computational calculations confirm the shortening of covalent bonds, which is believed to favor higher elastic constants and hardness values.

Applications
The potential applications of B6O as a wear-reduction coating for high-speed cutting tools, abrasives, or other high-wear applications, for example, have been an object of intense interest in recent years. However, despite intensive research efforts commercial applications have yet to be realized. This is partly because of the low fracture toughness of the hot-pressed material and the considerable practical challenges associated with densifying stoichiometric B6O material with good crystallinity. Furthermore, numerous mechanical properties of the material were until recently rather poorly understood.

Boron suboxide is also a promising body armor material, but its testing is still in the early stages and no commercial deployment is known as of 2019.

See also
 Suboxide
 Boron trioxide
 Boron monoxide
 Heterodiamond
 Beta carbon nitride

References

Boron compounds
Oxides